The Future Is Wild (also referred to by the acronym FIW) is a 2002 speculative evolution docufiction miniseries and an accompanying multimedia entertainment franchise. The Future Is Wild explores the ecosystems and wildlife of three future time periods: 5, 100, and 200 million years in the future, in the format of a nature documentary. Though the settings and animals are fictional, the series has an educational purpose, serving as an informative and entertaining way to explore concepts such as evolution and climate change.

The Future Is Wild was first conceived by independent producer Joanna Adams in 1996 and developed together with various scientists, including Dougal Dixon, best known as the author of the 1981 book After Man, which also explored future wildlife. The 2002 series was an international co-production, involving the British BBC, the Franco-German channel Arte, the German ZDF, the Austrian ORF, the Italian Mediaset, and the American Animal Planet and Discovery Channel. Wildly successful, The Future Is Wild continues to be broadcast to this day and has been shown on TV in more than 60 different countries.

The success of The Future Is Wild spawned a large multimedia franchise, including books, children's entertainment, exhibitions, theme park rides, educational material, and toys. There have also been cancelled projects, such as a potential movie adaptation, as well as a sequel series, The Future Is Wild 2. From 2016 onwards, there has been talk of "relaunching" the franchise through various projects, such as an action-adventure TV series and The Future is Wild VR (a virtual reality videogame), though no new media has yet materialized.

Premise 
The Future Is Wild explores twelve different future ecosystems across three future time periods: 5 million years in the future, 100 million years in the future, and 200 million years in the future. Four ecosystems from each period are explored and described.

Ice World: 5 million years in the future 
The early episodes describe a world after an ice age, when giant seal-like sea-birds roam the beaches and carnivorous bats rule the skies. Ice sheets extend as far south as Paris in the northern hemisphere and as far north as Buenos Aires in the southern hemisphere. The Amazon rainforest has dried up and become grassland. The North American plains have become a cold desert, and Africa has collided with Europe, enclosing the Mediterranean Sea. Without water to replace it in the dry climate, the Mediterranean has dried out into a salt flat dotted with brine lakes, as it has been in the past. Most of Europe is a frozen tundra. The part of Africa east of the African Rift Valley has broken away from the rest of the continent. Asia has dried up and is now mountainous. The once warm, tropical area of Central America has been transformed into a dry area. Australia has moved north and collided with eastern Indonesia.

Hothouse World: 100 million years in the future 
In the scenario for 100 million years in the future, the world is much hotter than at present. Octopuses and enormous tortoises have come on to the land, much of which is flooded by shallow seas surrounded by brackish swamps. Antarctica has drifted towards the tropics and is covered with dense rainforests, as it was before. Australia has collided with North America and Asia, forcing up an enormous, 12-kilometre-high mountain plateau much taller than the modern Himalayas. Greenland has been reduced to a small, temperate island. There are cold, deep ocean trenches. The Sahara has once again become the rich grassland it was millions of years ago.

New World: 200 million years in the future 
The hypothetical world of 200 million years from now is recovering from a mass extinction caused by a flood basalt eruption even larger than the one that created the Siberian Traps, wiping out 95% of the species on the planet. Fish have taken to the skies, squid to the forests, and the world's largest-ever desert is filled with strange worms and insects. All the continents have collided with one another and fused into a single supercontinent, a Second Pangaea or New Pangea. Although the formation of this new supercontinent has caused most distinctive geological features of its components to disappear, some can still be discerned, including Hudson Bay, the Novaya Zemlya archipelago and the Scandinavian Peninsula, as well as the general outline of Africa. One large global ocean with a single-current system gives rise to deadly hurricanes called hypercanes, which batter the coastlines of the continent all year long. The northwestern side of Pangaea II, drenched with an endless supply of rain, has become a temperate forest. Mountains resting at the end of the coast prevent most of the rain's moisture from reaching a long line of scrubby rainshadow deserts. The very center of the continent receives no rain at all and has become a barren, plantless desert. The survivors of the aforementioned mass extinction - fish, arthropods, worms and mollusks - populate the Earth and continue the process of adaptation and evolution.

Development and production 
The idea for The Future Is Wild was first conceived in 1996 by Joanna Adams, a British entrepreneur who has previously produced documentaries on modern and extinct animals. As an independent producer, Adams wanted to create a documentary series different from anything that had come before, and something that could not be copied by larger production companies. The series was envisioned as an entertaining, informative and inspirational way to explain planetary change and evolution, suitable for the popular market worldwide. In 1996, the concept of the series, and ideas for an accompanying multimedia franchise, was first unveiled at the Frankfurt Book Fair and the MIPTV Media Market.

The Future Is Wild was influenced by Scottish geologist and paleontologist Dougal Dixon's 1981 book After Man, which imagines wildlife and ecosystems 50 million years in the future. Dixon was brought in as a consultant early on in the development of the series and designed many of the creatures featured. The series was not able to use any of Dixon's creatures from After Man, given that the rights to adapting After Man were at this time owned by DreamWorks SKG. Nevertheless, several creatures were similar to Dixon's earlier designs, such as the Gannetwhale, a seal-like bird similar to whale-like penguins in After Man.

The series was created in close collaboration with scientists, filmmakers and animators. Although the future creatures and environments created for the series are all fictional, they were based on evolutionary principles and grounded in science. According to Adams: "If you look at the creatures, you cannot say with any degree of accuracy that this is going to happen, but what you can say is, given certain conditions, creatures like this could develop." Adams felt that it was important that the series would not just be dismissed as "another science-fiction fantasy", but that it would instead be seen as something credible. The geography of the future worlds depicted were designed through collaboration with geologists, and botanists and weather experts were consulted for the future environments. In addition to Dougal Dixon, several other animal experts, biomechanics engineers, and other scientists took part in designing the animals in the series.

In total, development and production of The Future Is Wild took six years. Throughout its development, some television executives had very different and conflicting ideas of what the series should be. In particular, some were concerned about humans being absent and wished for a contrived explanation as to what happened to humanity. Adams co-produced the series with the British BBC, the Franco-German channel Arte, the German ZDF, the Austrian ORF, the Italian Mediaset and the American Animal Planet and Discovery Channel. In total, the series cost £5 million to make. The BBC hoped that the miniseries would repeat the success it had with its prehistoric nature documentary series Walking with Dinosaurs, which attracted 17 million viewers in 1999.

Episodes

Distribution 
The Future Is Wild aired on BBC in the United Kingdom, on the Discovery Channel and Animal Planet in the United States, on ZDF in Germany, on ORF in Austria and on Mediaset in Italy. The series was wildly successful, winning several accolades and achieving high ratings on channels worldwide. The premiere of The Future Is Wild on Animal Planet in the United States doubled the channel's previous highest viewership (being viewed by about 1.8 million households) and The Future Is Wild to this day remains the number one most viewed series in Animal Planet's history. ZDF Enterprises sold the television rights of the series to 18 markets: Belgium, Canada, Croatia, the Czech Republic, Ecuador, France, Germany, Hong Kong, Hungary, Japan, Korea, Mexico, the Middle East, Poland, Romania, Russia, Slovenia and Venezuela. The series continues to be licensed internationally. As of 2021, The Future Is Wild has been broadcast in over 60 countries.

Multimedia franchise 
Following the airing of the series, The Future Is Wild branched out into various other media, including books, children's entertainment, exhibitions, theme park rides, educational material and toys.

Books 
The Future Is Wild was accompanied by two companion books, The Future Is Wild: A Natural History of the Future (2002), co-authored by Dougal Dixon and Joanna Adams, and The Wild World of the Future (2003) by Claire Pye. The Future Is Wild: A Natural History of the Future is a 128-page family reference work and The Wild World of the Future is a 96-page reference work for younger children. These books were translated into 20 different languages. The French translation of The Wild World of the Future, titled Les Animaux du Futur ('The Animals of the Future'), incorporated augmented reality, one of the first books to do so.

Another children's reference work, also 96 pages long, was co-authored by Dougal Dixon and Joanna Adams in the 2010s, titled The Future Is Wild: Our World Tomorrow. The book was published in 2016 in China by Hunan Publishing. Internationally, the book has been released in eBook and iBook format as an augmented reality book, under the title The Future Is Wild: The Living Book. The Future Is Wild: The Living Book was released in 2011, first presented at the 2011 Frankfurt Book Fair. The more than forty different augmented reality features were developed by the German company Meatio. The book has received scholarly attention as a work that showcases how augmented reality can encourage readers to connect with a book.

Animated children’s series 

In 2007, a 3D animated children's series (targeted at children aged six to twelve) based on The Future Is Wild premiered on Discovery Kids. Consisting of 26 episodes, each 22 minutes in length, the series was also simply called The Future Is Wild, and followed the four children C.G., Ethan, Emily and Luis, and their pet Squibbon, as they travelled through time and explored the settings and animals seen in the original series. According to Joanna Adams, the animated series, just like the original series, encourages viewers to think about the future of the planet, but "this time it is devoted particularly to kids and our future science is woven into some really fun stories about a group of time travelling kids." Portions of the original The Future Is Wild team worked on the series, and it was jointly produced by the Singaporean company iVL Animation and the Canadian company Nelvana. It was the first co-produced Singaporean 3D-animated TV programme to be broadcast in the United States and Germany.

Exhibitions 
The Future Is Wild has been adapted into exhibition form, both for use as a temporary exhibition or short-term events, and for long-term high-profile attractions. There have been four notable The Future Is Wild special exhibitions: at Futuroscope in France, the Sydney Aquarium in Australia,  in Germany and Dinosaurierpark Teufelsschlucht in Germany. There have also been exhibitions elsewhere, for instance in Japan.

The exhibition at Futuroscope was called  and was inaugurated on 5 April 2008 by French politician Hervé Novelli. The exhibition itself was fully interactive, utilzing augmented reality technology, and also contained the first augmented reality theme park ride in the world. The ride involved visitors sitting in a car, equipped with sensor-bracelets and googles with LCD-screens. The ride then simulated a time travel-safari expedition, with visitors being able to interact with the various creatures they encounter. In total, the exhibition cost €7 million to make. The exhibition received recognition among specialists in virtual reality, being the recipient of the prestigious Laval Virtual award in 2008. Les Animaux du Futur was shut down in 2012.

Like the Futuroscope exhibition and ride, the Sydney Aquarium exhibition, open from 2010 to 2011, employed advanced technology such as holograms, computer-generated imagery, animatronics and augmented reality. Among other things, augmented reality and face-tracking technology was used to allow visitors to see themselves in virtual diving gear, diving alongside some of the creatures. In contrast to most special exhibitions, The Future Is Wild installations were separated into species-specific installations spread throughout the aquarium, rather than concentrated in one place and each showcased new technologies. The exhibition also intended to encourage school participation, launching a competition called "Design a Future Marine Creature", which saw the winning design become a "life-size" permanent exhibit at the aquarium.

The exhibition at Dinosaurier-Park Münchehagen, opened in 2012, was considerably different from the French and Australian exhibitions, opting for a much more traditional exhibition containing just "life-size" models of some of the creatures of The Future Is Wild, with realistic backgrounds behind them. The hall containing the models was designed to act as a "journey's end", after visitors have walked through the millions of years of prehistoric creatures exhibited elsewhere in the park. In 2016, the sixteen The Future Is Wild models were moved to Dinosaurierpark Teufelsschlucht, another park, and placed at the end of the park's walkway of exhibited models of dinosaurs and other prehistoric creatures.

Other 
In 2004, The Future Is Wild was adapted into a 20-minute fulldome film. The fulldome film was made by Evans & Sutherland, in association with Discovery Channel International, Animal Planet and GOTO Optical Company and is narrated by the American actor John de Lancie.

The Future Is Wild had a very strong fanbase in Japan. In 2006–2007, the series was adapted into a story-driven manga, written and illustrated by artist Takaaki Ogawa. A line of toy figurines based on creatures from The Future Is Wild was produced by Tokyo-based company Diamond in 2006. Seven figures were released, each about five centimetres tall, depicting the Gannetwhale, Carakiller, Toraton, Poggle, Terabyte, Ocean Flish and Megasquid. The figures were also released in France in 2008 to coincide with the opening of the exhibition at Futuroscope, and in Australia in 2010 to coincide with the exhibition at the Sydney Aquarium.

Since The Future Is Wild is based on actual science concerning evolution, the environment, ecology and climate change, the series has been adapted into educational material. Marketed as "a unique mix of science and imagination combined with education and entertainment", there are United Kingdom curriculum specific lesson plans based on the series, which are freely available. Among other things, lessons include children creating their own future environments, plants and animals. In France, experimental educational projects were coordinated with The Future Is Wild exhibition at Futuroscope, and included classroom resources such as printed charts and an interactive CD-ROM programme.

Cancelled projects 
Following the success of The Future Is Wild, plans were made to adapt the series into a feature film with Warner Bros., but those plans fell through after the release of the film Avatar (2009), when Warner Bros. felt that the bar for such a film had been raised too high. Joanna Adams and the team at one point also worked on developing a sequel documentary series to the original The Future Is Wild series, dubbed The Future Is Wild 2, and had raised the necessary funding, but the project collapsed when Discovery Channel announced that they would no longer be making documentaries.

Planned revival of the franchise 
In 2016, John H. Williams, a producer of the animated Shrek franchise, and his animation company Vanguard Animation, acquired the rights to produce an animated TV series based on The Future Is Wild. In a January 2016 interview, Williams stated that "we believe The Future Is Wild will be a spectacular franchise launch point for us into quality television" and also mentioned that Vanguard Animation was working on creating a 26-part science fiction action-adventure series, planned to be produced as an international co-production.

At the same time as Vanguard Animation acquired the rights to produce a new TV series, Adams also stated in an interview that she was looking at relaunching the franchise: "coinciding with this new series development, we are rolling out our plans for digital media, such as mobile games, apps and interactive multimedia books". Adams believes that more modern technology could help to lift and help launch The Future Is Wild in a new direction, while still re-creating or further developing some of the "original stories" and "original themes". Coinciding with this attempted revival of the franchise, The Future Is Wild was once more at the Frankfurt Book Fair and MIPTV Media Market events in 2016 to present new planned content.

In 2015, the virtual reality and augmented reality developer Cornel Hillmann, and his studio, STUDIO CGARTIST, began developing The Future Is Wild for virtual reality, initially focusing on small-scale preview projects. The first completed project was a small preview programme for Google Cardboard, which met with positive response at the 2016 Frankfurt Book Fair. A The Future Is Wild virtual reality game, The Future Is Wild VR, was in development in 2016. According to Hillmann, the game was intended to be a first-person exploration game with survival elements, with players able to travel through five different future time periods between 50 and 200 million years in the future. The game was also planned to introduce 20 new creatures, some of them based on designs originally intended for the unproduced The Future Is Wild 2. Hillmann had the opportunity to correspond with Dougal Dixon, who offered his input on some of the designs. As of 2019, the game was still in development. According to Hillmann, The Future Is Wild VR will eventually be part of a "major brand relaunch" alongside other types of The Future Is Wild media and material.

Notes

References

External links 

 Official website
 

2002 British television series debuts
2002 British television series endings
2000s British documentary television series
2000s British science fiction television series
Documentary television shows about evolution
Animal Planet original programming
Books about evolution
British science fiction television shows
Futurology documentaries
Speculative evolution
Scientific speculation
Television series set in the future
Discovery Channel original programming